Bao Junhui was a late eighth-century Chinese poet. She came from a respected family during the Tang dynasty and achieved fame as a poet during the reign of Emperor Dezong (779-804).

Poetry
Bao Junhui and other talented women, such as the five Song sisters, were invited to reside in the palace as scholars who were held in great esteem. She, like many of the other respected poets who resided in the palace, was called upon to write poetry during special occasions, including banquets. She was considered to be as talented as the five Song sisters. The little known about Bao Junhui comes from a memorial she presented to the emperor asking for permission to leave the palace to care for her aged mother:

Notable poems
Notable poems by Bao Junhui:

"Tea Ceremony in the East Pavilion"
"Sung Out in Sympathy for Flowers"
"Moon at the Frontier Pass"

References

8th-century Chinese poets
Tang dynasty poets
Chinese women poets
Year of birth unknown
Year of death unknown
8th-century Chinese women writers